Stacey Lee Smith (born April 3, 1954) is an American ice dancer. With partner John Summers, she is the 1978–1980 U.S. national champion. They represented the United States at the 1980 Winter Olympics where they placed 9th.  She received her bachelor's degree and M.D. at Northwestern University, completed her residency at Washington University in St. Louis, and currently practices psychiatry.

Competitive highlights
(with Frank Recco)

(with Summers)

References

External links
 

American female ice dancers
Figure skaters at the 1980 Winter Olympics
Olympic figure skaters of the United States
1954 births
Living people
People from Delaware, Ohio
Sportspeople from Ohio
21st-century American women